Leeds East Airport Church Fenton , formerly RAF Church Fenton, is an airport and former Royal Air Force station located  south-east of Tadcaster, North Yorkshire, England and  north-west of Selby, North Yorkshire, near the village of Church Fenton. The airport has had a licensing application from the UK Civil Aviation Authority rejected. This led to the scrapping of plans to allow regular scheduled passenger flights and charter flights to various European destinations. The airport has subsequently been awarded an operating licence for private use.

History

RAF Church Fenton 

The airfield was originally a Royal Air Force station known as RAF Church Fenton. It opened on 1 April 1937 when the station was declared open and on 19 April the first station commander Wing Commander W.E. Swann assumed command. Within two months No. 71 Squadron RAF had arrived with the Gloster Gladiator.

It saw the peak of its activity during the years of the Second World War, when it served within the defence network of fighter bases of the RAF providing protection for the Leeds, Bradford, Sheffield and Humber estuary industrial regions.

After the war it at first retained its role as a fighter base, being among the first to receive modern jet aircraft, namely the Gloster Meteor and the Hawker Hunter. In later years, its role was mainly flight training. No. 7 Flying Training School was based here between 1962 and 1966 and again between 1979 and 1992, equipped with Hunting Aircraft Jet Provost T3 trainers.

For some years it was home to the Royal Navy Elementary Flying Training School (RNEFTS) using the Scottish Aviation Bulldog, and again 1979–1992, triggered by the introduction of the Panavia Tornado, being the first station to receive the new turboprop-powered Short Tucano T.1 basic fast jet trainers. From 1998 to 2003 Church Fenton was the RAF's main Elementary Flying Training airfield.

Station closure
On 25 March 2013 it was announced that Church Fenton would close by the end of 2013. The units would be relocated to RAF Linton on Ouse by 31 December 2013. By 19 December 2013, all units had relocated and the airfield was closed. Some equipment was to be relocated to RAF Topcliffe. MoD security continued to secure the site until disposal. A NOTAM was issued suspending the air traffic zone (ATZ) at the end of 2013.

Current use

The site was sold on 23 December 2014 to Makins Yorkshire Strawberries except for a section containing the Air Cadets.  Makins intends to keep the airfield operational.

In February 2015, Makins Enterprises (the new airfield owners) launched their new website, renaming the airfield. It will now be known as 'Leeds East Airport', with the slogan "Yorkshire's newest aviation destination." It is believed that Makins Enterprises will target the business jet market, while also running a flying school and other ventures.

The second series of the ITV drama Victoria was shot at a hangar onsite in 2017.

References

Citations

Bibliography

External links

 Fighting Church Fenton – a book about RAF Church Fenton by Peter Mason

Buildings and structures in North Yorkshire
Airports in England